Hernán Jorge Crespo (born 5 July 1975) is an Argentine professional football coach and former player. He is the current manager of Qatari club Al-Duhail.

A prolific striker, Crespo scored over 300 goals in a career spanning 19 years. At international level, he scored 35 goals and is Argentina's fourth highest goalscorer behind only Sergio Agüero, Gabriel Batistuta and Lionel Messi. He played in three FIFA World Cups: 1998, 2002, 2006. At club level, Crespo was the world's most expensive player, when he was bought by Lazio from Parma in 2000 for €56 million (£35.5 million). He was top scorer in the 2000–01 Serie A with 26 goals, playing for Lazio.

Crespo's awards include three Serie A scudetti, a Copa Libertadores, a Premier League title and an Olympic Games silver medal. In 2004, he was named by Pelé in the FIFA 100 list of the world's greatest living players. Crespo never received a red card during his career.

Club career

River Plate
Crespo made his debut with River Plate during the 1993–94 season, scoring 13 goals in 25 league appearances as River Plate won the Apertura league title. In 1996, he helped River win the Copa Libertadores, scoring twice in the home leg of the final in Buenos Aires.

Parma
Crespo left River Plate for Parma on 14 August 1996 after he won the silver medal with Argentina at the 1996 Summer Olympics and finished as the top scorer with six goals. He failed to score in his first six months at the club and was routinely booed, with head coach Carlo Ancelotti coming in for much criticism for keeping faith with the selection of Crespo. His faith, however, vindicated – Crespo went on to score 12 times in 27 matches in his first Serie A season and Parma finished runners-up to Juventus. The turning point was the standing applause he received for his brace against Cagliari in March 1997. Parma won the 1998–99 Coppa Italia and he scored the opening goal in Parma's 3–0 UEFA Cup final victory over Marseille. He had scored 80 goals in four seasons.

Lazio
In 2000, Lazio broke the then-world transfer record by paying £35 million (they paid £16 million in cash and transferred Matías Almeyda and Sérgio Conceição) to acquire Crespo, who in turn finished as Serie A's top scorer with 26 goals. Lazio, however, failed to defend its league title in 2001, and the following season, Crespo suffered from some injuries, while new signings Jaap Stam and Gaizka Mendieta failed to live up their reputations, following the departures of playmakers Juan Sebastián Verón and Pavel Nedvěd. Crespo was left without the attacking support he had enjoyed in 2001, but still scored a respectable haul of goals. Lazio's financial problems, however, forced the club to sell several players, and following Alessandro Nesta's transfer to A.C. Milan, speculation over Crespo's future intensified.

Inter Milan
On 31 August 2002, Crespo, expected to shine again after suffering from injuries, signed with Inter Milan as a replacement for the ex-player Ronaldo for a €26 million fee and Bernardo Corradi. Lazio later re-valued Corradi to €5.5 million. Inter was short of strikers after the highly rated Mohamed Kallon was injured in August, and only Álvaro Recoba and Christian Vieri, together with reserves Bernardo Corradi and Nicola Ventola, were available.

Crespo scored seven goals in 18 Serie A appearances, along with nine goals in 12 Champions League matches, until he was sidelined for four months by injury in early 2003.

Chelsea
Crespo was transferred to Premier League club Chelsea on 26 August 2003 for a fee of reported £16.8 million which also created a controversy in alleged false accounting. Following the transfer, Christian Vieri, Crespo's former strike partner at Inter, claimed that the club are essentially "weakening" by selling players of such caliber. He made his league debut on 30 August 2003 as a substitute for Adrian Mutu in a 2–2 home draw against Blackburn Rovers. On 16 September 2003, Crespo made his European debut, replacing Jimmy Floyd Hasselbaink in the 2003–04 Champions League group stage, which ended in a 1–0 away win after a late goal from William Gallas against Sparta Prague. Four days later, he scored his first goals, a double, in a 5–0 away victory against Wolverhampton Wanderers. Crespo made 31 appearances (including 19 in the league) in all competitions, scoring 12 goals.

Loan to A.C. Milan 
After José Mourinho took over as Chelsea manager for the 2004–05 season, Crespo became surplus to Chelsea's plans following the arrival of Didier Drogba and was loaned to A.C. Milan, as requested by then-manager Carlo Ancelotti. He scored a total of ten league goals, and scored twice in the 2005 UEFA Champions League Final in a defeat to Liverpool.

In scoring a Champions League goal with Milan, Crespo became the first player to score with five teams in the competition, doing so with each of the sides he had played for since moving from South America to Europe in 1996.

Return to Chelsea 
After Chelsea's failed attempts to land a big-name striker during the summer of 2005, Mourinho needed competition for striker Didier Drogba and decided to recall Crespo from A.C. Milan, convincing him that he had a future in England. Crespo made his first return appearance in a 2–1 FA Community Shield win over Arsenal. He scored his first league goal of 2005 against newly promoted Wigan Athletic in the 93rd minute of Chelsea's season opener in a 1–0 win, with a left foot curler into the top corner from 25 yards. The 2005–06 league title was Crespo's first league title victory in European football.

Return to Inter Milan

Second spell; loan from 2006 to 2008

Though he scored 13 goals in all competitions and won the 2005–06 Premier League, Crespo requested a return to Italy in order to rejoin A.C. Milan, but Chelsea refused and announced that Crespo would remain a Chelsea player until the club accepted a suitable offer for him. On 7 August 2006, Crespo joined Inter on a two-year loan. He scored his 125th Serie A goal against Siena on 2 December 2006, and his 200th career goal in Europe on 2 April 2007. On 13 May, Crespo scored a hat-trick to help Inter defeat Lazio 4–3 and win the Scudetto.

Third spell; permanent deal
Crespo was released from Chelsea on 3 July 2008, following the expiration of his contract, and was signed by Inter on a one-year contract for free. In the 2008–09 season, under José Mourinho, his former manager at Chelsea, Crespo only made 13 Serie A appearances, including two starts. He was excluded from the Champions League squad.

Genoa
Following the expiration of his contract at Inter, Crespo was quickly snapped up by Genoa, taking Diego Milito's place, who moved in the opposite direction. On 8 June 2009, it was reported that Crespo had a medical check to formalize his transfer. Crespo cited his ambition to make the Argentina 2010 World Cup squad as one of his key reasons for making the move to Genoa. On 13 September, Crespo scored his first goal of the 2009 season against Napoli.

Return to Parma and retirement
In January 2010, Crespo returned to Parma after the club agreed the deal with Atalanta and Genoa. Crespo replaced Nicola Amoruso who left for Atalanta, while Atalanta's Robert Acquafresca moved to Genoa to replace Crespo. The Argentine striker returned after ten years to Parma. Crespo scored just once before the season's end, against Livorno. The striker enjoyed a more successful 2010–11 season, scoring 11 goals. In doing so, he became Parma's top scorer for a fourth time, which remains a post-war club record. Despite mounting speculation of his departure, Crespo signed a one-year contract extension on 30 June 2011. However, a lack of first-team opportunities saw Crespo and Parma mutually agree to terminate his contract on 2 February 2012, although he did vow to return to the city he had fallen in love with. He is the club's all-time record goalscorer with 94 goals in 201 appearances.

Although Crespo was signed to play in Bengal Premier League Soccer in late January 2012, with a salary of £533,000 for the two-month tournament, the competition never got underway. He clarified that his career as a footballer had finished in November 2012.

International career
Crespo won his first cap for Argentina in a friendly match against Bulgaria in February 1995. He was a member of the Argentina side that finished runners-up in the 1995 King Fahd Cup, the predecessor to the FIFA Confederations Cup.

In 1996, Crespo was a member of the Argentina men's football squad for the Olympic Games. Crespo helped take Argentina to the final with braces against Spain in the quarter-final and Portugal in the semi-final. However, Argentina lost the final to Nigeria, despite Crespo scoring his sixth goal of the tournament from the penalty spot.

Crespo scored his first goal for the Argentina senior team in a 1998 World Cup qualifier against Ecuador and hit a hat-trick against FR Yugoslavia in a pre-World Cup friendly. Crespo was called up to the final roster for the 1998 World Cup but only made one substitute appearance, as Gabriel Batistuta led the Argentine attack. Crespo's attempt was saved by David Seaman in the second round penalty shoot-out with England, but Argentina progressed 4–3.

During qualification for the 2002 World Cup, Crespo was top scorer for Argentina with nine goals as they topped the South American group. During the finals, Batistuta was again preferred to Crespo as Argentina's starting centre forward. Crespo appeared as a substitute in all three group matches, including the final match against Sweden, which Argentina needed to win in order to qualify for the second round. Though Crespo scored an 88th-minute equaliser, it was not to be enough and Argentina were eliminated.

After the 2002 World Cup, Batistuta retired from international football, and Crespo took over as Argentina's number 9. During the 2006 World Cup qualifying stage, Crespo scored seven times, including two goals in Argentina's 3–1 win over arch-rivals Brazil in Buenos Aires, which sealed qualification and made him Argentina's career scoring leader in World Cup qualifiers.

Crespo scored Argentina's first goal of the 2006 World Cup in their opening match against the Ivory Coast. He also scored in the next game against Serbia and Montenegro (6–0) and the second round match against Mexico. However, Argentina's run was ended as they were knocked out by host nation Germany on penalties in the quarter-final.

Crespo's final appearances for Argentina came at 2007 Copa América. He scored twice in Argentina's 4–1 victory over the United States in their Group C opener, tying Diego Maradona's team scoring record. He then overtook Maradona in Argentina's second match, scoring a penalty kick against Colombia. However, he substituted immediately after converting the kick due to injury and missed the remainder of the tournament.

After the Copa América, Crespo did not receive any further call-ups to the national team and ended his international career with 35 goals in 64 matches, being currently Argentina's fourth highest goalscorer of all-time.

Style of play
Crespo was a fast, tenacious, powerful, and complete striker, who possessed good technique, composure in possession, and an eye for goal; he also excelled in the air. A prolific and opportunistic goal scorer, he was capable of finishing well both with his feet and with his head, and was known for his ability to score acrobatic goals. He was effective off the ball, due to his work-rate, tactical intelligence, and attacking movement, which he often used to provide depth for his team or create space for his teammates; he was also capable of linking up well with other forwards. Due to his goalscoring ability and wide range of skills, he is regarded as one of the best strikers of his generation, and as one of Serie A's best ever foreign players. He faced several injuries throughout his career, which limited his playing time at times.

Nicknames
While commonly known as Hernán, Crespo was christened Hernando Jorge Crespo, after his grandfather of the same name. His most common nickname is "Valdanito", after legendary compatriot striker Jorge Valdano, as he was thought to be his heir due to their similar appearance and eye for goal. He is also called, although less often, "El Polaco" (or "The Pole") as his family addressed him that way in his youth because of his light hair.

Media
Crespo was sponsored by sportswear company Nike and appeared in Nike commercials. In a global Nike advertising campaign in the run-up to the 2002 World Cup in Korea and Japan, Crespo starred in a "Secret Tournament" commercial (branded "Scorpion KO") directed by Terry Gilliam, appearing alongside footballers such as Thierry Henry, Ronaldo, Francesco Totti, Ronaldinho, Luís Figo, Roberto Carlos and Hidetoshi Nakata, with former player Eric Cantona as the tournament "referee".

Post-playing and managerial career

Coach: Parma and Modena
On 12 November 2012, Crespo announced that he would pursue a career in coaching and would begin work in early July 2013.

He served as youth coach for the Primavera team of Parma during the 2014–15 season. After the disbandment of Parma, on 30 June 2015, Crespo was announced as the new manager of Serie B club Modena. He was sacked on 26 March 2016, with the club one point above the relegation zone.

Back to Parma
On 22 June 2017, Chinese businessman Jiang Lizhang bought 60% of the stocks of Parma, and assigned Crespo as the new vice president of the club. He worked for Jiang's company Desport as a technical adviser beforehand.

On 2 January 2018, with the club opting to remove the figure of vice-president from its board, Crespo was named new club ambassador.

Banfield
On 19 December 2018, Crespo was appointed manager of Argentine Primera División side Banfield, on an 18-month deal. After finishing 16th in his first season, he was sacked five games into the next in September 2019, having won just one of those games.

Defensa y Justicia
On 25 January 2020, Crespo was appointed manager of Defensa y Justicia, also in the Argentine top tier. On 23 January 2021, he led Defensa y Justicia to their first international trophy by winning the Copa Sudamericana after defeating Club Atlético Lanús by 3–0.

São Paulo
On 12 February 2021, Crespo was appointed manager of Brazilian Série A club São Paulo on a two-year deal. He made his debut 16 days later on the first day of the Campeonato Paulista, in a 1–1 home draw with Botafogo-SP. He won the title on 23 May, after a 2–0 aggregate victory over Palmeiras; this was the club's first honour in nine years and the first in the competition since 2005.

On 13 October 2021, Crespo left São Paulo on a mutual agreement. The club were 13th in the national league after 25 games, and he was replaced by team icon Rogério Ceni.

Personal life
In May 2005, Crespo married equestrian Alessia Andra Rossi, with whom he has three children. She is Italian.

Career statistics

Club

International

Scores and results list Argentina's goal tally first, score column indicates score after each Crespo goal.

Managerial statistics

Honours

Player 
River Plate
Argentine Primera División: 1993 (Apertura), 1994 (Apertura)
Copa Libertadores: 1996

Parma
Coppa Italia: 1998–99
Supercoppa Italiana: 1999
UEFA Cup: 1998–99

Lazio
Supercoppa Italiana: 2000

A.C. Milan
Supercoppa Italiana: 2004

Chelsea
Premier League: 2005–06
FA Community Shield: 2005

Inter Milan
Serie A: 2006–07, 2007–08, 2008–09
Supercoppa Italiana: 2006, 2008

Argentina
Pan American Games: 1995
Summer Olympics runner-up: 1996
Copa America runner-up:  2007

Individual
Argentine Primera División top scorer: 1993–94
Football at the Summer Olympics top scorer: 1996 (shared)
UEFA Cup Final Man of the Match: 1999
Coppa Italia top scorer: 1998–99, 2006–07 (shared)
Serie A top scorer: 2000–01
ESM Team of the Year: 2000–01
FIFA 100
FIFA World Cup Silver Shoe: 2006
FIFA World Cup All-star team: 2006
FIFPro World XI nominee: 2005, 2006

Manager 

Defensa y Justicia
 Copa Sudamericana: 2020

São Paulo
 Campeonato Paulista: 2021

Notes

References

External links

 

Profile at La Gazzetta dello Sport 2009–10 
BBC profile

1975 births
Living people
Argentine people of Polish descent
People from Vicente López Partido
Footballers from Buenos Aires
Argentine footballers
Association football forwards
Club Atlético River Plate footballers
Parma Calcio 1913 players
S.S. Lazio players
Inter Milan players
Chelsea F.C. players
A.C. Milan players
Genoa C.F.C. players
Argentine Primera División players
Campeonato Brasileiro Série A managers
Serie A players
Premier League players
Copa Libertadores-winning players
UEFA Cup winning players
Olympic footballers of Argentina
Argentina international footballers
1995 King Fahd Cup players
Footballers at the 1995 Pan American Games
Footballers at the 1996 Summer Olympics
1998 FIFA World Cup players
2002 FIFA World Cup players
2006 FIFA World Cup players
2007 Copa América players
Medalists at the 1995 Pan American Games
Pan American Games gold medalists for Argentina
Pan American Games medalists in football
Medalists at the 1996 Summer Olympics
Olympic medalists in football
Olympic silver medalists for Argentina
FIFA 100
Argentine expatriate footballers
Argentine expatriate sportspeople in Italy
Argentine expatriate sportspeople in England
Argentine expatriate sportspeople in Brazil
Expatriate footballers in Italy
Expatriate footballers in England
Argentine football managers
Modena F.C. managers
Club Atlético Banfield managers
Defensa y Justicia managers
São Paulo FC managers
Al-Duhail SC managers
Argentine expatriate football managers
Expatriate football managers in Italy
Expatriate football managers in Brazil
Expatriate football managers in Qatar